The Nácar-Colunga is a Spanish translation of the Bible originally published in 1944. This work was performed by Eloíno Nácar Fúster and Alberto Colunga Cueto.

It constitutes one of the most popular Spanish versions in the Roman Catholic Church.

See also 
 Bible translations
 Bible translations into Spanish

Footnotes

External links 
Biblia Nácar-Colunga para descargar. 
Texto accesible en bibliatodo.com

Bible translations into Spanish
1944 books